The Jus Reservoir is a reservoir in Jasin District, Melaka, Malaysia.

History
The construction of the dam and reservoir started in 2000 to address the water needs of Malacca. The reservoir and the dam started its operation in 2003.

Geography
The dam is capable of storing 43 billion litres of water over an area of 5.5 km2 in an overall area of 23 km2. The raw water supply for the reservoir is channeled from Durian Tunggal Reservoir, Kesang River and Batang Melaka River. The water from the reservoir goes to the water treatment facilities in Merlimau and Durian Tunggal.

See also
 Geography of Malaysia
 List of tourist attractions in Malacca

References

2003 establishments in Malaysia
Geography of Malacca
Jasin District
Reservoirs in Malaysia